Sunjo of Joseon (29 July 1790 – 13 December 1834, reigned 1800–1834) was the 23rd king of the Korean Joseon Dynasty. Sunjo was the 2nd son of King Jeongjo with Royal Noble Consort Su, one of King Jeongjo's concubines.

Biography
He was born with the title of His Royal Highness Prince Yi Gong on 29 July 1790 (18 June 1790 in lunar calendar). Upon the death of his father, King Jeongjo, Yi Gong ascended to the throne at age 10 on 4 July 1800 lunar calendar.

In 1802, King Sunjo married Lady Kim, later known posthumously as Queen Sunwon, daughter of Kim Jo-sun who was a leader of Andong Kim clan.

Since he ascended the throne at a young age, Queen Dowager Jeongsun, the second queen of King Yeongjo, ruled as queen regent, which allowed her to wield power over state affairs. Despite King Sunjo's efforts to reform politics, the fundamental principles of government deteriorated. The state examination became disordered and corruption in the government personnel administration prevailed. This resulted in disorder in society and various riots broke out among the people, including the revolt by Hong Gyeong-nae in 1811–1812. The Ogajaktongbeop (五家作統法), a census registration system to group five houses as one unit, was carried out in this period, and oppression against Roman Catholicism began in earnest.

King Sunjo died after reigning for 35 years in 1834 at the age of 44. He was first buried next to Jangneung, Paju, the tomb of King Injo and Queen Inryeol but later moved to Illeung, Seoul as the Feng Shui at the old site was deemed to be unfavourable.

Family
Father: King Jeongjo of Joseon (28 October 1752 – 18 August 1800) (조선 정조)
Grandfather: King Jangjo of Joseon (13 February 1735 – 12 July 1762) (조선 장조)
Grandmother: Queen Heongyeong of the Pungsan Hong clan (6 August 1735 – 13 January 1816) (헌경왕후 홍씨)
Mother: Royal Noble Consort Su of the Bannam Park clan (8 May 1770 – 26 December 1822) (수빈 박씨)
Grandfather: Park Jun-won (1739 – 1807) (박준원)
Grandmother: Lady Won of the Wonju Won clan (1740 – 1783) (부인 원주 원씨)
Consorts and their Respective Issue(s):
Queen Sunwon of the Andong Kim clan (순원 왕후 안동 김씨; 8 August 1789 – 21 September 1857)
Yi Yeong, Crown Prince Hyomyeong (이영 효명세자; 18 September 1809 – 25 June 1830), first son
Princess Myeongon (명온 공주; 1810 – 1832), first daughter
Princess Bokon (복온 공주; 1818 – 1832), third daughter
Unnamed Grand Prince (대군; 1820 – 1820), second son
Princess Deokon (덕온공주; 1822 – 1844), fourth daughter
Yi Byeon, Prince Deokwan (이변 덕완군; 25 July 1831 — 16 January 1864), adoptive (third) son
Royal Consort Suk-ui of the Miryang Park clan (숙의 밀양 박씨; d. 1854)
Princess Yeongon (영온옹주; 1817 – 1829), second daughter

His full posthumous name
King Sunjo has the 2nd longest posthumous name for an emperor of Korea.
 English: King Sunjo Seongak Yeondeok Hyeondo Gyeongin Sunhui Cheseong Eungmyeong Heumgwang Seokgyeong Gyecheon Baegeuk Yungwon Donhyu Euihaeng Soyun Huihwa Junryeol Daejung Jijeong Honghun Cheolmo Geonsi Taehyeong Changun Honggi Gomyeong Bakhu Ganggeon Sujeong Gyetong Suryeok Gongyu Beommun Anmu Jeongryeong Gyeongseong-hyo the Great of Joseon 
Hangul: 
Hanja: 純祖先覺淵德顯道景仁純禧體聖凝命欽光錫慶繼天配極隆元敦休懿行昭倫熙化峻烈大中至正洪勳哲謨乾始泰亨昌運弘基高明博厚剛健粹精啓統垂曆建功裕範文安武靖英敬成孝肅皇帝

Ancestry

In popular culture
 Portrayed by Kim Seung-soo in the 2016 KBS2 TV series Love in the Moonlight.

See also
 History of Korea
 Hong Gyeong-nae

References

1790 births
1834 deaths
19th-century Korean monarchs
House of Yi